Max Burgers Aktiebolag (Max Burgers Incorporated), earlier Max Hamburgerrestauranger AB, is a Swedish fast food corporation.

History 
The chain was founded by Curt Bergfors (27 February 1949 - 8 May 2022) and Britta Fredriksson in Gällivare, Sweden in 1968. Bergfors' oldest son Richard Bergfors is the current president since 2002.

Until the 1980s, Max was the largest hamburger restaurant chain in northern Sweden, with only a single restaurant outside of Norrland (on Drottninggatan, Stockholm). This changed during the 1990s, when they expanded to become a nationwide fast-food chain. By 2011, there were around 85 restaurants in Sweden, compared to just 40 five years earlier.

From 2005 to 2010, Max expanded extensively to the western parts of Sweden, and in 2010, plans were announced to expand to Riyadh, Egypt and Dubai with Kuwait following. Three years later Landmark Group was operating three Max restaurants in Dubai, where the menu was modified to exclude bacon. The chain also operates restaurants in Poland.

The first restaurant in Norway opened on May 11, 2011 followed by the first in Denmark on March 1, 2013, and in Poland September 1, 2017.

As of November 5 2022, there are 146 restaurants in Sweden, 20 restaurants in Poland, 9 in Norway and 4 in Denmark.

Reception 

Max was the first hamburger restaurant in Sweden to outcompete McDonald's restaurants, which happened in 1991 in Umeå and Luleå, where McDonald's (who arrived later in northern Sweden than in Sweden's major cities) in fact closed their restaurants before returning a few years later. In 2007, the popularity of Max forced the McDonald's in Skellefteå, Piteå and, again, in Luleå out of business.

See also 
 List of hamburger restaurants

References

External links 

 

Fast-food hamburger restaurants
Fast-food franchises
Restaurants in Sweden
Restaurants established in 1968
Swedish companies established in 1968